These are the 1971 Five Nations Championship squads:

England

Head coach: Don White

 Tony Bucknall (c.)*
 Fran Cotton
 Dick Cowman
 David Duckham
 Keith Fairbrother
 Peter Glover
 Charlie Hannaford
 Bob Hiller
 Jeremy Janion
 Peter Larter
 Tony Neary
 Barry Ninnes
 Jacko Page
 David Powell
 John Pullin
 Peter Rossborough
 John Spencer (c.)
 Chris Wardlow
 Ian Wright

 captain in the first game

France

Head coach: Fernand Cazenave

 Jean-Louis Azarete
 Max Barrau
 Jean-Pierre Bastiat
 René Benesis
 Jean-Louis Berot
 Roland Bertranne
 Pierre Biemouret
 Roger Bourgarel
 Jack Cantoni
 Christian Carrère (c.)
 Benoît Dauga (c.)*
 Daniel Dubois
 Marc Etcheverry
 Jean Iracabal
 Michel Lasserre
 Jean le Droff
 Jean-Pierre Lux
 Michel Pebeyre
 André Quilis
 Jean Sillieres
 Claude Spanghero
 Walter Spanghero
 Jean Trillo
 Gérard Viard
 Pierre Villepreux
 Michel Yachvili

 captain in the first two games

Ireland

Head coach: Ronnie Dawson

 Barry Bresnihan
 Alan Duggan
 Mike Gibson (c.)
 Edwin Grant
 Denis Hickie
 Mike Hipwell
 Ken Kennedy
 Tom Kiernan (c.)*
 Sean Lynch
 Willie John McBride
 Barry McGann
 Ray McLoughlin
 Mick Molloy
 Barry O'Driscoll
 Fergus Slattery
 Roger Young

 captain in the first game

Scotland

Head coach: Bill Dickinson

 Rodger Arneil
 Alastair Biggar
 Arthur Brown
 Gordon Brown
 Peter Brown (c.)
 Sandy Carmichael
 Quintin Dunlop
 John Frame
 Ronnie Hannah
 Frank Laidlaw
 Nairn MacEwan
 Alastair McHarg
 Ian McLauchlan
 Duncan Paterson
 Chris Rea
 Brian Simmers
 Stephen Turk
 Ian Smith
 Billy Steele
 Jock Turner

Wales

Head coach: Clive Rowlands

 John Bevan
 Gerald Davies
 Mervyn Davies
 John Dawes (c.)
 Gareth Edwards
 Ian Hall
 Barry John
 Arthur Lewis
 Barry Llewelyn
 Dai Morris
 Mike Roberts
 John Taylor
 Delme Thomas
 Denzil Williams
 J.P.R. Williams
 Jeff Young

External links
1971 Five Nations Championship at ESPN

References

Six Nations Championship squads